The following is a list of notable related in a significant way with the Swedish island of Gotland.

Gallery

List

References 

 
Gotland
Gotland